Archaeospheniscus lopdelli was the largest species of the extinct penguin genus Archaeospheniscus, standing about  high, or somewhat less than the extant emperor penguin. It is only known from bones of a single individual (Otago Museum C.47.21) which was found in the Late Oligocene Kokoamu Greensand Formation (27-28 MYA) at Duntroon, New Zealand. Bones apparently belonging to this species are now also known from the Late Eocene La Meseta Formation (34-37 MYA) on Seymour Island, Antarctica (Tambussi et al., 2006).

As the bird is not very well distinguished except in size from its contemporary congener Archaeospheniscus lowei and the size range, an estimated 85–120 cm, is in the upper range of the variation found in modern penguins, it is probable that A. lopdelli is a synonym of A. lowelli. As the recent finds in Antarctica suggest, this is far from certain, however, and there remains much to be learned about the systematics and biogeography of the two larger Archaeospheniscus species.

The species' binomen honors J. C. Lopdell, who assisted Marples in recovering the fossils of this bird and others found in the Duntroon excavations.

References

 Marples, Brian J. (1952): "Early Tertiary Penguins of New Zealand". New Zealand Geol. Surv., Paleont. Bull. 20: 1-66.
 Simpson, George Gaylord (1971): "A review of the Pre-Pleistocene Penguins of New Zealand". Bulletin of the American Museum of Natural History 144: 319–378. PDF fulltext
 Tambussi, C. P.; Acosta Hospitaleche, C. I.; Reguero, M. A. & Marenssi, S. A. (2006): "Late Eocene Penguins from West Antarctica: Systematics and Biostratigraphy". Geological Society, London, Special Publication 258: 145–161.

Archaeospheniscus
Oligocene birds
Extinct penguins
Cenozoic Antarctica
Cenozoic animals of Oceania
Paleogene Oceania
Extinct animals of Antarctica
Extinct birds of New Zealand
Cenozoic animals of Antarctica
Taxa named by Brian John Marples